The 2013–14 Oral Roberts Golden Eagles men's basketball team represented Oral Roberts University during the 2013–14 NCAA Division I men's basketball season. The Golden Eagles were led by 15th year head coach Scott Sutton and played their home games at the Mabee Center. They were members of the Southland Conference. They finished the season 17–16, 10–8 in Southland play to finish in a tie for sixth place. They advanced to the quarterfinals of the Southland Conference tournament where they lost to Sam Houston State.

This was their last season as a member of the Southland as they will rejoin The Summit League in July, 2014 after leaving the league only two years previous.

Roster
Source

Schedule
Source

|-
!colspan=9 style="background:#000080; color:#D4AF37;"| Exhibition

|-
!colspan=9 style="background:#000080; color:#D4AF37;"| Regular season

|-
!colspan=9 style="background:#000080; color:#D4AF37;"| Southland tournament

All KGEB games listed are games that will air live and will also air on GEB America. Each FCS weekday home game will air on KGEB and GEB America tape delayed at 11 pm.

References

Oral Roberts Golden Eagles men's basketball seasons
Oral Roberts
2013 in sports in Oklahoma
2014 in sports in Oklahoma